The 2005–06 Real Madrid C.F. season was the club's 75th season in La Liga. This article lists all matches that the club played in the 2005–06 season, and also shows statistics of the club's players.

For the second consecutive season, Real Madrid did not win any competitions. This was their first consecutive trophyless seasons since 1982–83 to 1983–84.

Players

 (Captain)

Transfers

In

Total spending:  €96 million

On loan

Out

Total income:  €35 million

Competitions

Pre-season
In June 2005, president Florentino Pérez presented the "2005 Real Madrid World Tour", which included 6 friendly matches in North America and Asia. Two more matches were played in Central Europe during the second stage of the pre-season, including a homage to Ferenc Puskás, which was held in Hungary. The last match, an annual Trofeo Santiago Bernabéu, was played on home soil.

La Liga

League table

Results by round

Matches

Copa del Rey

UEFA Champions League

Group stage

Group F

Round of 16

Top scorers
  Ronaldo – 14
  Zinedine Zidane – 9
  Júlio Baptista – 8
  Robinho – 8
  Raúl – 5
  Roberto Carlos – 5

Statistics

Players statistics

See also
2005–06 La Liga
2005–06 Copa del Rey
2005–06 UEFA Champions League

References

External links
Realmadrid.com Official Site
Real Madrid Team Page 
Real Madrid (Spain) profile
uefa.com - UEFA Champions League
Web Oficial de la Liga de Fútbol Profesional
FIFA

Real Madrid
Real Madrid CF seasons